Eppo is a Dutch comic magazine named after the protagonist of the back-page-gags. It was the result of the merging of the magazines Pep and Sjors. Eppo ran as a weekly magazine from 1975 to 1988; it was revived in 2009 as a fortnightly magazine.

History and profile
The first thirteen issues of Eppo appeared in the last three months of 1975 and introduced comics such as Storm, Roel Dijkstra, Franka (originally a character from  the Pep-featured Het Misdaadmuseum) and Sjors & Sjimmie. All of them became staples of the magazine, alongside Eppo himself.

In 1985, after more than 500 issues, Eppo merged with Wordt Vervolgd, a television program devoted to comics, cartoons, and related topics. Early 1988 the magazine became the bi-weekly Sjors & Sjimmie. The first years were still successful, but in 1994 the name was shortened to Sjosji in an attempt to reach a younger generation. It backfired, and by the end of the decade  Sjosji ceased publication.

In February 2009 the magazine was revived as Eppo and taken back to heart by its original readers. Household names as Storm, Franka, Agent 327, and Eppo go hand in hand with new comics such as Elsje,  Eugene and Dating for Geeks.

Comics published in the magazine
Comics published in the magazine are as follows:

House comics
 Agent 327
 Eppo
 De Familie Doorzon
 De Familie Fortuin
 Franka
 De Generaal
 Heinz
 Grote Pyr
 Roel en zijn Beestenboel
 Sjors & Sjimmie
 Storm 
 Tom Carbon

Foreign import
 Astérix 
 Blueberry 
 Lucky Luke

References

External links
  
De Eppo-index 

1975 establishments in the Netherlands
1975 comics debuts
1988 comics endings
2009 comics debuts
Comics magazines published in the Netherlands
Children's magazines published in the Netherlands
Dutch-language magazines
Weekly magazines published in the Netherlands
Biweekly magazines
Magazines established in 1975
Magazines disestablished in 1988
Magazines established in 2009
Magazines about comics